Limnaecia cuprella is an extinct species of moth in the family Cosmopterigidae. It was described from Baltic amber.

References

Natural History Museum Lepidoptera generic names catalog

Fossil Lepidoptera
†cuprella
Prehistoric insects of Europe
Taxa named by Hans Rebel